The 1991–92 season was the 87th season in the history of AJ Auxerre and the club's 12th consecutive season in the second division of French football. In addition to the domestic league, Auxerre participated in this season's edition of the Coupe de France and the UEFA Cup.

Competitions

Overall record

Division 1

League table

Results summary

Results by round

Matches

Coupe de France

UEFA Cup

First round

References

AJ Auxerre seasons
Auxerre